The Belgrade Formation is a limestone geologic formation in North Carolina characterized by limestone coquina mixed with sand, and thinly laminated clays. It preserves fossils dating back to the Paleogene period.

Description
The Belgrade Formation is composed of two subunits: the Pollocksville member and the Haywood Landing member. The Pollocksville member is composed of unconsolidated oyster shells and sand. It was deposited in the Oligocene and early Miocene. The Haywood Landing member is composed of shelly sands and thinly laminated clays. The Belgrade Formation was originally considered part of an Eocene formation called the Trent Marl before it was identified as being deposited in the Miocene and split off.

Fossil content

Mammals

Reptiles

Fish

Invertebrates

See also

 List of fossiliferous stratigraphic units in North Carolina

References

 

Paleogene geology of North Carolina